Philip Hugh Davies FSA FRHS FRAS (born August 1950) is a heritage and planning consultant and the former planning and development director for Historic England. He has written a number of books on the architectural and topographical history of India and London.

Early life
Philip Davies was born in August 1950. He was educated at Tollington Grammar School (1961–68) in Muswell Hill and then at Queen's College, University of Cambridge, where he obtained a degree in history.

Career
Davies was director of the London region of Historic England from 1997 to 2005 and then planning and development director from 2005 to 2011. He originated and set up English Heritage's buildings at risk programme in London. He now works as a heritage and planning consultant. In 2011 he was briefly interim chief executive for the Fulham Palace Trust. He has written a number of books on the architectural and topographical history of India and London.

He is a fellow of the Society of Antiquaries of London, a fellow of the Royal Historical Society, a fellow of the Royal Asiatic Society, and a trustee of the Heritage of London Trust.

Selected publications
 Splendours of the Raj: British Architecture in India 1660-1947. John Murray, 1985. 
 Troughs and Drinking Fountains. Chatto & Windus, London, 1989. (Chatto curiosities) 
 Penguin Guide to the Monuments of India: Vol.II Islamic, Rajput, European. Penguin, 1989. 
 Lost London 1870–1945. Transatlantic Press, 2009.
 Panoramas of Lost London. Transatlantic Press, 2011. 
 Images of Lost London 1875–45. Atlantic Publishing, Croxley Green, 2012. 
 London Hidden Interiors. Atlantic Publishing, 2012. 
 Lost England 1870-1930. Atlantic Publishing, 2016. 
 Lost Warriors - Seagrim and Pagani of Burma - The Last Great Untold Story of WWII. Atlantic Publishing, 2017.

References

External links 

Historians of London
Living people
1950 births
Alumni of Queens' College, Cambridge
Historic England
English architectural historians
Fellows of the Society of Antiquaries of London
Fellows of the Royal Philatelic Society London
Fellows of the Royal Asiatic Society